Rolf Ulrik Jansson (born 2 February 1968) is a Swedish former footballer who played as a midfielder. Jansson began his career in Östers IF. In 1994 he transferred to Helsingborgs IF where he became a Swedish champion in 1999. He was a member of Sweden's 1990 FIFA World Cup squad and won a total of six caps during his career.

Personal life 
Jansson is the brother of former professional footballer Jesper Jansson and the uncle of the professional footballer Kevin Höög Jansson.

Career statistics

International

References

External links 
 home.swipnet.se 
 
 

1968 births
Living people
Swedish footballers
Sweden youth international footballers
Sweden under-21 international footballers
Sweden international footballers
1990 FIFA World Cup players
Allsvenskan players
Helsingborgs IF players
Östers IF players
Ängelholms FF players
Association football midfielders
People from Växjö
Sportspeople from Kronoberg County